AOM is a commonly used abbreviation for the following subjects:

Organizations
 Academy of Management,  a professional association for scholars of management and organizations
 AOM French Airlines, a former French airline, partly acquired by Swissair
 Art of Movement, a Seattle-based b-boy crew
 Avatar Orchestra Metaverse, a group which uses Second Life to create online musical performances
 Alliance for Open Media, a non-profit association of technology companies that develops an open, royalty-free video format
 Association of Mediterranean Ombudsmen, an association for public ombudspersons in Mediterranean countries

Science and engineering
 Acousto-optic modulator, a device used in optics to shift the angle, intensity, frequency or phase of light
 Acute otitis media, inflammation of the middle ear
 Anaerobic oxidation of methane, a microbiological process occurring in marine sediments
 Associate-O-Matic, a store building web application for Amazon Associates
 Azoxymethane, a potent carcinogen

Other
 Academy of Music (disambiguation)
 Automatic order matching, used by stock exchanges to electronically match by and sell orders
 Aviation ordnanceman, a U.S. Navy rank
 Award of Merit, a designation achieved by dogs at a conformation show